McKee Creek may refer to:

McKee Creek (British Columbia), Canada
McKee Creek (West Virginia), United States
McKee Run, also known as McKee Creek, Pennsylvania, United States

See also
McKees Creek